Saccharopolyspora rectivirgula is a species of bacteria. It is a Gram-positive rod. It was formerly known as Micropolyspora faeni.

Inhalation of the bacteria can cause the disease farmer's lung, a type of hypersensitivity pneumonitis. Handling hay bales increases exposure to the bacteria and increases the risk of developing the disease.

References

External links
Type strain of Saccharopolyspora rectivirgula at BacDive -  the Bacterial Diversity Metadatabase

Pseudonocardineae
Bacteria described in 1964